The Pakistani plan for a military action which commenced on March 25, 1971, in the then East Pakistan was code-named Operation Searchlight. This is the Operation Searchlight order of battle which was outlined on March 19, 1971, by Major General Khadim Hussain Raja, GOC 14th infantry division, and Major General Rao Farman Ali in the GHQ of Pakistan Army in Dhaka, (then)East Pakistan.

Pakistani Forces

MLA Headquarters and Eastern Command in Dhaka
Lt. General Tikka Khan Governor and Chief Martial Law Administrator
Major General Iftekhar Janjua – Advisor
Major General Shawkat Riza – Advisor
Brigadier Gulam Jilani – Chief of Staff MLA HQ
Brigadier Nessar Ahmed – Director General EPR

14th Infantry Division: 
Major General Khadim Hussain Raja – GOC 14th Infantry Division and OC East Pakistan
Colonel Staff: Col. Saadullah
G.S.O -1 (Operations): Lt. Col Taj Khan
G.S.O -1 (Intelligence): Lt. Col Minwari

Attached Units:
29th Cavalry - Lt.Col. Sagir Hussain Syeed (detached to Rangpur)
43rd Light Ack Ack – Lt. Col. Shaffat Ali - Dhaka Airport
19th Signal Regiment – Lt. Col. Iftekhar Hussain – Dhaka Cantonment
Company 3rd Commando Battalion – Lt. Col. Z.A. Khan
Army Aviation Squadron #4: 8 Helicopters (4 Mi-4 and 4 Alouette III)

Pakistan Air Force:
CO: Air Commodore Inam Ul  Haq Khan
14th Squadron: 20 F-86 Sabres
3 T-33 and 2 Helicopters
Temporary attachment: 4 C-130 Hercules planes and PIA Fokker Friendship Aircraft.  
 
Pakistan Navy:
Rear Admiral Sharif
PNS Jessore (Gunboat) (detached to Khulna)
PNS Comilla (Gunboat)
PNS Sylhet  (Gunboat)

Dhaka
Major General Rao Farman Ali: Officer Commanding Dhaka Area
57th Infantry Brigade: Brigadier General M. Jahanzeb Arbab 
22nd Baluch Regiment: Pilkhana Dhaka
18th Punjab Regiment
32nd Punjab Regiment – Lt. Col. Taj
31st Field Artillery Regiment – Lt. Col. Zahed Hassan
13th Frontier Force Regiment – Reserve and Cantonment Security

Comilla
53rd Infantry Brigade: Brig. Iqbal Shaffi
31st Punjab – Lt. Col. Sarfraz Ahmed Khan and later Lt Col Riaz Hussain (stationed at Sylhet).
20th Baluch – Lt. Col. SH Fatami (stationed at Chittagong).
53rd Field Artillery – Lt. Col. Yakub Malik ( acting Garrison/Fortress Commander in absence of Brig Iqbal). 
3rd Commando Battalion – Lt. Col. Z.A. Khan. (Moved to Dacca for Operation Searchlight).
171st Mortar Battery.
40th Field Ambulance – Lt. Col. A.N.M Jahangir.
Brigade Intelligence Detachment   
Chittagong Relief Column: (Brig. Iqbal Shaffi)
24th Frontier Force – Lt. Col Shahpur Khan (after Shahpur fell in action, the command of only infantry battalion in the Column was taken over by Brigadier Iqbal himself). 
88th Mortar Battery.
Brigade Signals Detachment. 
No Engineering Elements.

Chittagong
CO: Brig. Iqbal Shafi from April when HQ 53 Brigade was airlifted from Comilla, replaced by 107 Brigade (ex 9 Division) on arrival from West Pakistan.

Lt. Col. Abdul Aziz Sheikh: Sector Commander EPR;

Brig Mujamdar - Center Commadant EBR.
20th Baluch – Lt. Col. SH Fatami
Company 31st Punjab

Pakistan Navy:
Commodore A.R. Mumtaj - Chittagong Naval Base
PNS Jahangir (destroyer): Commander T.K Khan
PNS Rajshahi (Gunboat) 
PNS Balaghat (Patrol boat)

Sylhet
31st Punjab – Lt. Col. Sarfraz Ahmed Khan.
Company in Shamshernagar
Company in Maulavibazar

Rangpur
23rd Infantry Brigade: Brig. Abdullah Khan Malik
20th Field Ambulance – Lt. Col Masud
Brigade Signal & Engineers
23rd Field Artillery – Lt. Col. Shaffi in Saidpur
29th Cavalry – Lt. Col. Sagir Hussain Sayyed
26th Frontier Force – Lt. Col. Hakeem A. Quereshi in Saidpur   
25th Punjab – Lt. Col. Shafkat Baluch (detached to Rajshahi)
23rd Field Regiment Company in Bogra: Captain Mohammad Reza
25th Punjab Company in Pabna: Captain Asghar
26th Frontier Force Company in Dinajpur

Jessore
107th Infantry Brigade: Brig A. R. Durrani
25th Baluch Regiment
24th Field Artillery (elements)
55th Field Artillery
7th Field Ambulance
22nd Frontier Force – Lt Col. Shamsi (detached to Khulna)
Company in Kushtia: Major Shoaib

References

 
 
 
 

Bangladesh Liberation War
Military operations involving Pakistan
Orders of battle